The Ford CX is a car that was produced by Ford Motor Company in Britain from 1935 to 1937. During that period 96,553 cars were produced. It was powered by an 1172 cc Ford Sidevalve engine. It was a de-luxe version of the Ford Model C Ten.

CX
Sedans
Cars introduced in 1935
1930s cars